The  (Biographical Dictionary of Finland, BLF) is a Finnish Swedish-language biographical dictionary that was published between 2008–2011.

In Finland, Suomen kansallisbiografia ('the National Biography of Finland') was published between 2003–2007 in ten volumes, edited by historian and professor Matti Klinge. In 2008, the Society of Swedish Literature in Finland began publishing a corresponding Swedish-language national biographical dictionary, . The editorial board is chaired by professor Henrik Meinander and the chief editor is associate professor .

The BLF is partly based on the content of the Finnish-language , from which articles are translated, but it also contains original articles – primarily about people connected to the Swedish-speaking culture in Finland – which have in turn been partly translated into . In addition to biographies of people born in Finland, it also contains those of foreign-born explorers who made Finland known abroad, as well as leading commanders of foreign or occupying powers who had a major influence on domestic affairs. In terms of the selection of persons,  and  may deal with the same persons as in the Swedish Svenskt biografiskt lexikon, but from a Finnish perspective.

The dictionary is divided into three eras: volume one, the Swedish era; volume two, the Russian era; and volumes three and four, the Republic era. The printed work was published jointly by the Society of Swedish Literature in Finland and the Swedish publisher Atlantis in 2008–2011. Since 2014, all articles have been freely available on its website.

See also 

 Uppslagsverket Finland

References

External links 

 Biografiskt lexikon för Finland 

Biographical dictionaries
Finnish encyclopedias
21st-century encyclopedias
2008 non-fiction books